Niedersachsenhalle is an exhibition hall located in Hanover, Germany and part of Hannover Congress Centrum. It covers an area of 1,627 m2 and has a seating capacity of 1,512 people. It is used for events such as trade fairs and concerts. Notable past performers include Pink Floyd, Iron Maiden, Metallica, Rory Gallagher, AC/DC, Frank Zappa, and many others.

References

See also
 Eilenriedehalle

Convention centres in Germany
Buildings and structures in Hanover
Tourist attractions in Hanover